Decadent Sound of Faye, also translated as Faye Beautiful Music, is a 1995 Mandopop album recorded by the Chinese singer Faye Wong when she was based in Hong Kong. It consists entirely of rearranged versions of songs originally released by Teresa Teng.

Name
The word ‘decadent’ is an ironic echo of early PRC condemnation of music such as that of Taiwanese singer Teresa Teng's music as mǐmǐ zhī yue (靡靡之樂). The title of this album is a pun: during the Cultural Revolution, Teng's songs were condemned as "decadent sounds" by the Communist Party of China. The album title is literally translated as Faye's Decadent Music, but as the character "" (fēi, i.e. the name Faye in Chinese) has the same pronunciation as the related character "" (fēi, "not" in Classical Chinese), the title can also be construed as "Non-Decadent Sounds".

Word play on Faye's name  fēi in Mandarin has also been used on two Cinepoly compilation albums: 菲卖品 Fēi mài pǐn ("Faye sale product", a pun on 非卖品 fēi mài pǐn, "Not-for-sale product") and 菲主打 Fēi zhǔdǎ ("Faye main beat", a pun on 非主打 Fēi zhǔdǎ "not main beat").

Tribute to Teresa Teng
The album consists entirely of cover versions of songs originally released by her idol Teresa Teng, one of the most revered Chinese singers of the 20th century. Teng's music remains extremely popular in Japan, Taiwan, Hong Kong, Southeast Asia and mainland China. A duet was planned for the album, but Teng died before this could be recorded; Wong considered scrapping the project out of respect. However, Faye sang this duet, Li Bai's "清平調" with Teresa posthumously in a memorial celebrating her 60th birthday.

Reception
Decadent Sounds sold quite well despite initial negative criticism. It has come to be recognised as a classic by her fans and is held as an example of imaginative covering by recent critics. Not only did Wong show that she shared Teresa Teng's clear, sweet singing voice, but the arrangements added an unexpected freshness to many of the songs.

Track listing
Tracks are listed with their original Chinese titles, along with a transcription in pinyin and an unofficial English translation. 

"雪中蓮" (Xuĕ zhōng lián) –
 Lotus in the Snow
"你在我心中" (Nĭ zài wŏ xīn zhōng) –
 You Are in My Heart
"但願人長久" (Dàn yuàn rén chángjiŭ) –
 Wishing We Last Forever
"君心我心" (Jūn xīn wŏ xīn) –
 His Heart, My Heart
"初戀的地方" (Chūliàn de dìfāng) –
 Place of First Love
"南海姑娘" (Nánhăi gūniáng) –
 South China Sea Girl
"假如我是真的" (Jiărú wŏ shì zhēn de) –
 If I Were for Real
"翠湖寒" (Cuì hú hán) –
 Cold Blue-Green Lake
"黃昏裡" (Huánghūn lĭ) –
 At Dusk
"" (Nàihé) –
 Naihe
"一個小心願" (Yī ge xiăo xīnyuàn) –
 One Small Wish
"又見炊煙" (Yòu jiàn chuīyān) –
 See the Chimney Smoke Again
"原鄉情濃" (Yuán xiāng qíng nóng) –
 Sentiments of a Native Village

Notes and references

1995 albums
Faye Wong albums
Cinepoly Records albums
Teresa Teng tribute albums
Mandopop albums